Shah Moradlu (also Romanized as Shāh Morādlū; also known as Shāh Mard‘alī and Shāh Morād) is a village in Qeshlaq Rural District, in the Central District of Ahar County, East Azerbaijan Province, Iran. At the 2006 census, its population was 53, in 10 families.

References 

Populated places in Ahar County